Scribner is a city in Dodge County, Nebraska, United States. The population was 857 at the 2010 census.

History
Scribner was platted in 1870 when the railroad was extended to that point. It was named for publishing magnate Charles Scribner I.  Today, Scribner remains a town of trade, even though the railroad no longer serves the town.

By the mid-1970s, the future of railroad service came into question. The Chicago & North Western  tracks had been experiencing mildly declining freight traffic volumes. Revenue railroad service ultimately ended in spring of 1982, when flooding from the Elkhorn River & nearby Pebble Creek damaged sections of the track. With freight traffic mildly declining & flooding damage, the C&NW promptly filed a request with the Interstate Commerce Commission to abandon the line. Permission was granted a short time later, leaving the tracks with a dismal future. Plans were made to revive railroad service from the newly formed Fremont & Elkhorn Valley Railroad, who purchased the abandoned C&NW track. However, the costs were too high to revive railroad service, and the tracks were removed in 1988.

Geography
Scribner is located at  (41.666040, -96.662541).

Climate
This climatic region is typified by large seasonal temperature differences, with warm to hot (and often humid) summers and cold (sometimes severely cold) winters.  According to the Köppen Climate Classification system, Scribner has a humid continental climate, abbreviated "Dfa" on climate maps.

Demographics

2010 census
As of the census of 2010, there were 857 people, 385 households, and 223 families living in the city. The racial makeup of the city was 95.7% White, 0.5% African American, 0.8% Native American, 0.7% Asian, 0.5% from other races, and 1.9% from two or more races. Hispanic or Latino of any race were 1% of the population.

There were 385 households, of which 24.9% had children under the age of 18 living with them, 46.0% were married couples living together, 7.3% had a female householder with no husband present, 4.4% had a male householder with no wife present, and 42.3% were non-families. 39.5% of all households were made up of individuals, and 25.2% had someone living alone who was 65 years of age or older. The average household size was 2.13 and the average family size was 2.86.

The median age in the city was 50.4 years. 21.6% of residents were under the age of 18; 5.2% were between the ages of 18 and 24; 16.6% were from 25 to 44; 26.5% were from 45 to 64; and 30% were 65 years of age or older. The gender makeup of the city was 48.8% male and 51.2% female.

2000 census
As of the census of 2000, there were 971 people, 389 households, and 245 families living in the city. The population density was 1,523.2 people per square mile (585.8/km). There were 428 housing units at an average density of 671.4 per square mile (258.2/km). The racial makeup of the city was 98.35% White, 0.31% African American, 0.10% Native American, 0.72% from other races, and 0.51% from two or more races. Hispanic or Latino of any race were 0.93% of the population.

There were 389 households, out of which 28.5% had children under the age of 18 living with them, 53.0% were married couples living together, 7.7% had a female householder with no husband present, and 37.0% were non-families. 32.4% of all households were made up of individuals, and 19.8% had someone living alone who was 65 years of age or older. The average household size was 2.31 and the average family size was 2.94.

In the town the population was spread out, with 23.3% under the age of 18, 6.7% from 18 to 24, 22.0% from 25 to 44, 17.4% from 45 to 64, and 30.6% who were 65 years of age or older. The median age was 43 years. For every 100 females, there were 79.2 males. For every 100 females age 18 and over, there were 77.8 males.

As of 2000 the median income for a household in the city was $30,455, and the median income for a family was $40,625. Males had a median income of $31,389 versus $18,553 for females. The per capita income for the city was $16,173. About 6.1% of families and 9.4% of the population were below the poverty line, including 8.6% of those under age 18 and 13.3% of those age 65 or over.

Notable people
George Dern, United States Secretary of War, Governor of Utah, Businessman, Grandfather of actor Bruce Dern, Great Grandfather of actress Laura Dern
J. Martin Klotsche, educator and historian
Gregg Olson, baseball player

References

Cities in Dodge County, Nebraska
Cities in Nebraska